Scellus notatus  is a species of fly in the family of Dolichopodidae.
It is found in the  Palearctic .

References

External links
Images representing Scellus at BOLD

Insects described in 1781
Hydrophorinae
Palearctic insects
Diptera of Europe
Taxa named by Johan Christian Fabricius